Diego Esteban Simonet (born 26 December 1989) is an Argentine handball player for Montpellier and the Argentina men's national handball team.

He represented Argentina at the 2011 World Men's Handball Championship in Sweden,  2012 London Summer Olympics, 2013 World Men's Handball Championship in Spain and 2015 World Men's Handball Championship in Qatar.  His action defending Argentina brought home six continental championships (2000, 2002, 2004, 2010, 2012, and 2014).

Two of his brothers, Sebastian and Pablo, defended Argentina at Olympic and World Championship competitions.

Awards and recognition
Clubs
Coupe de la Ligue: 2016
2020 South and Central American Men's Handball Championship: Best right wing

References

External links

1989 births
Living people
Argentine male handball players
Argentine people of French descent
Olympic handball players of Argentina
Handball players at the 2012 Summer Olympics
Pan American Games silver medalists for Argentina
Sportspeople from Buenos Aires
Pan American Games gold medalists for Argentina
Pan American Games medalists in handball
Expatriate handball players
Argentine expatriate sportspeople in France
Montpellier Handball players
South American Games silver medalists for Argentina
South American Games medalists in handball
Handball players at the 2011 Pan American Games
Handball players at the 2015 Pan American Games
Handball players at the 2019 Pan American Games
Competitors at the 2018 South American Games
Medalists at the 2015 Pan American Games
Medalists at the 2019 Pan American Games
Medalists at the 2011 Pan American Games
Handball players at the 2020 Summer Olympics
21st-century Argentine people